The Australian Cat Federation (ACF) is an Australian organisation created in 1972. Its goal is to better the breeding of cats, to recognise new breeds, and to keep standards and rules regarding competitions.

History 
The association was created in 1972 under the name Australian National Cat Federation. The first ANCF cat show was organised in 1973 in Adelaide. The ANCF created its bimonthly publication National Cat in the same year, though its first issue would not appear until 1977. The association took its current name Australian Cat Federation in 1975.

In 1982, the association recognised the Somali cat, as well as the lilac and chocolate colours of the Persian cat. In 1984, the AFC adopted the standards set by the Fédération Internationale Féline (FIFé). The Balinese cat was recognised in 1985. In 1986, the ACF began to distance itself from the FIFé, and would not return until 1988. 1986 also saw an important modification in the Exotic Shorthair standard.

In 1991, the ACF recognised the Ragdoll. The 1993 cat show saw the introduction of the Australian method of judging, in which the judges move to the cats' boxes, rather than the other way around (known as Australian open-style judging). The Turkish Van and the Australian Mist (under the name spotted mist) were recognised in the same year. The Cymric was recognised in 1995. The Japanese Bobtail, the long-haired Scottish Fold, the Singapura, the Tonkinese and the Bengal were recognised in 1997, and the Sphynx, the Burmilla and the Ocicat in 1999.

In 2001, the ACF hosted the annual meeting of the World Cat Congress (WCC) and registered the first Selkirk Rex cats. Since the creation of the association, many arguments have been made for the creation of a common breeding registry with the other Australian feline association, Coordinating Cat Council of Australia (CCCA).

See also
List of cat breeds
List of cat registries

References

External links
Australian Cat Federation

Cat registries
Cats in Australia
Animal welfare organisations based in Australia
1972 establishments in Australia
Organizations established in 1972